Appalachian Melody is an album by Mark Heard, released in 1979 on Solid Rock Records.

Track listing
All songs written by Mark Heard.

Side one
 "On the Radio" - 3:41
 "Castaway" - 3:30
 "Bless My Soul" - 4:08
 "Here I Am (Once Again)" - 4:41
 "With the Setting Sun" - 1:47

Side two
 "Appalachian Melody" - 4:25
 "Happy Cornbread Anniversary" - 0:48
 "Two Trusting Jesus" - 4:18
 "Jonah's Song" - 5:30
 "Sidewalk Soliloquy" - 3:22
 "The Last Time" - 3:19
 "The Saints" - 0:27

Compact disc bonus tracks 

 "Bless My Soul" (Demo) - 3:28
 "Appalachian Melody" (Demo) - 4:02
 "Happy Cornbread Anniversary" (Demo) - 0:34
 "Two Trusting Jesus" (Demo) - 2:06
 "Jonah's Song" (Demo) - 3:37
 "The Saints" (Demo) - 0:46
 "Saints Are Singin'" (Demo) - 2:25

Personnel 
The band
 Mark Heard – acoustic and electric guitars, piano, mandolin, hambone, vocals, harmonies, arranging, co-producer, mixing, photography, album artwork
 Larry Norman – background vocals, producer, arranger, photography, album artwork
 Randy Stonehill – background vocals
 Tom Howard – Fender Rhodes, orchestration
 Jon Linn – lead guitar
 Flim Johnson – bass guitar
 Peter Johnson – drums

 Additional musicians 
 Al Perkins – pedal steel guitar, dobro
 Chuck Long – electric and acoustic guitars, additional photography
 Alex MacDougall – percussion and congas
 Janet Sue Heard – harmony, additional photography
 Tom Howard String Ensemble conducted by Tom Howard

 Production notes
 Recorded December 1977 through January 1979
 Horse and Sandwich and the Hooey Room – pre-production location
 Ken Suesov – engineer, mixing
 George Price – engineer
 John Rhys – engineer
 Skip Saylor – engineer
 Tom Seufert – engineer
 EXR Exciter System – mixing system
 Bernie Grundman – mastering
 A&M – mastering location
 David K. Hills – additional photography

References

1979 albums
Mark Heard albums